Gordon is an unincorporated community and coal town in Boone County, West Virginia, United States. Gordon is approximately 12 miles from Madison. Gordon is accessible from Boone County Route 26, which is located right off West Virginia Route 85 at the Van Bridge split.

Gordon was named in 1883-1884 by Asa White, the postmaster, after a favorite nephew, Gordon Mason.  It has also been known as Detroit for the Detroit Mining Company which had a mine there.

References 

Unincorporated communities in Boone County, West Virginia
Unincorporated communities in West Virginia
Coal towns in West Virginia